Päiviö Hetemäki (8 July 1913 in Jyväskylä – 12 May 1980) was a politician of the National Coalition Party in Finland. He served four times as a minister in the Finnish Council of State between 1953 and 1972. Hetemäki was also the chairman of the Confederation of Finnish Industries.

He also served in the Board of the Bank of Finland 1971–1977.

References

1913 births
1980 deaths
People from Jyväskylä
People from Vaasa Province (Grand Duchy of Finland)
National Coalition Party politicians
Deputy Prime Ministers of Finland
Ministers of Finance of Finland
Ministers of Defence of Finland
Members of the Parliament of Finland (1945–48)
Members of the Parliament of Finland (1948–51)
Members of the Parliament of Finland (1951–54)
Members of the Parliament of Finland (1954–58)
Members of the Parliament of Finland (1958–62)
Finnish military personnel of World War II
Central bankers
Finnish bankers